More, more, more of Nora Aunor is the second studio album by the Filipino singer-actress Nora Aunor, released in 1968 by Alpha Records Corporation in the Philippines in LP format and later released in 1999 in a compilation CD format. The album contains some of the original Filipino compositions by Robert Medina, Rober Dominic and Danny Subido among others, except for the three songs including "It's Not Unusual" originally sung by Tom Jones in 1965 and composed by Gordon Mills and Les Reed.

Background
The album is a follow-up to Aunor's first album, Nora Aunor Sings, and is a collection of 12 songs put together by Alpha Records Corporation.

Track listing

Side one

Side two

Album credits 
 Arranged by Doming Valdez - Ramrods
Recorded at CAI Studios
Photos by Tropicana - D'Manila Portrait and Heiddy's

See also
 Nora Aunor Discography

References 

Nora Aunor albums
1968 albums